The 2000 Generali Open was a men's tennis tournament played on outdoor clay courts at the Tennis Stadium Kitzbühel in Kitzbühel, Austria that was part of the International Series Gold of the 2000 ATP Tour. It was the 45th edition of the tournament and was held from 24 July until 30 July 2000. Second-seeded Àlex Corretja won the singles title.

Finals

Singles

 Àlex Corretja defeated  Emilio Benfele Álvarez 6–3, 6–1, 3–0 ret.
 It was Corretja's 3rd singles title of the year and the 12th of his career.

Doubles

 Pablo Albano /  Cyril Suk defeated  Joshua Eagle /  Andrew Florent 6–3, 3–6, 6–3

References

External links
 ITF tournament edition details

Generali Open
Austrian Open Kitzbühel
2000 in Austrian tennis